Kałduny may refer to the following villages in Poland:
Kałduny, Łódź Voivodeship
Kałduny, Warmian-Masurian Voivodeship
Kalduny refers to dumplings in Belarusian and other Slavic cuisines.